The 1987 NHL Supplemental Draft was the second NHL Supplemental Draft. It was held on June 13, 1987.

Selections by round

Round one
The first round was limited to teams that missed the 1987 Stanley Cup playoffs.

Round two

See also
1987 NHL Entry Draft
1987–88 NHL season
List of NHL players

Notes

References

External links
 1987 NHL Supplemental Draft player stats at The Internet Hockey Database

Draft
1987